The law of Peru includes a constitution and legislation. The law of Perú is part of the Roman-Germanic tradition that concedes the utmost importance to the written law, therefore, statutes known as leyes are the primary source of the law.

Constitution

The present constitution is that of 31 December 1993.

Legislation
The legislature is Congreso de la República del Perú. The gazette is called El Peruano, Diario Oficial. Legislation includes instruments called laws (Spanish: ley) and decrees (Spanish: decreto)

List of legislation

No Longer in force:

Penal Code of 1836
Penal Code of 28 July 1924
Civil Code of 1936
Civil Procedure Code of 1912
Constitution of 1978
Commerce Code of 1902 (Only partially in force).

Currently in force:

Civil Code of 1984 (Código Civil)
Code of Criminal Procedure of 1940 (Only for Lima)
Penal Code of 8 April 1991 (Legislative Decree No 635)
Decree Law 25418 of April 1992
Legislative Decree No 822 of 23 April 1996
Code of Criminal Procedure of 22 July 2004 (Legislative Decree No 957)
General Law of the Administrative Proceedings (Ley del Procedimiento Administrativo General No Ley 27444).
Law of Smuggling (Mainly for Smuggling of objects and never human smuggling) in Spanish as Ley de los delitos aduaneros No Ley 28008

Courts and judiciary

There is a Supreme Court and there are Superior Courts, Courts of First Instance and Courts of Peace. There was formerly a Real Audiencia of Lima.

Legal practitioners
There is a College of Advocates of Lima (Spanish: Colegio de Abogados de Lima). since 1811. The college has been equated with a bar association. Legislation relevant to advocates has included decrees of 6 April 1837, 31 March 1838, 27 April 1848, and laws of 8 January 1848 and 21 October 1851.

Criminal law

There is a Penal Code (Spanish: Código Penal). The Penal Code of 1836 was the country's first. The Penal Code of 28 July 1924 was replaced by the Penal Code of 8 April 1991 (Legislative Decree No 635).

The Code of Criminal Procedure of 1940 was partially superseded by the Code of Criminal Procedure of 22 July 2004 (Legislative Decree 957)

Mining
According to Guillaume, the mining laws of Peru were reformed by a new law passed by Congress, in January 1877, which reformed the old laws very considerably, establishing a new basis for mining property, and introducing other important reforms for the protection of this industry. The mining laws of various nations were studied, and the new laws were, in part, based upon the law then in force in Spain.

Copyright

As to copyright, see Legislative Decree No 822 of 23 April 1996.

Tax

Taxes of the central government as Income Tax and Sales Tax are collected by the National Administration named SUNAT(Superintendencia Nacional de Administración Tributaria).

Other history
See the New Laws of 1542.

See also
Peruvian nationality law

References

Peru. Guide to Law Online. Law Library of Congress.
Helen Lord Clagett. A Guide to the Law and Legal Literature of Peru. Library of Congress. Washington. 1947. HathiTrust
David M Valderrama. Law & Legal Literature of Peru: A Revised Guide. Second Edition. (Latin American series, volume 39). Library of Congress. US Government Printing Office. Washington. 1976. HathiTrust Google Books
José Antonio Honda. Energy Law in Peru. Kluwer Law International, Wolters Kluwer. 2010. Google Books
Alfredo Bullard Gonzalez. Competition Law in Peru. Wolters Kluwer Law & Business. 2017. . Google Books
A D Garman. Mining Laws of Peru. U.S. Department of Commerce, Bureau of Mines. 1929. (Information Circular, volume 6216). Google Books
Roger Daniel Moore, Joaquin Servera and James La Salle Brown. Trading under the Laws of Peru. US Government Printing Office. 1930. Google Books
Lynn Bartlett. Labor law and Practice in Peru. US Bureau of Labor Statistics. 1968. (Issue 338 of BLS Report). Google Books:  
Jorge Eugenio Castañeda. A Reference to the Laws of Peru in Matters Affecting Business in Various Aspects and Activities. Inter-American Development Commission. 1947. Google Books
Hernando de Lavalle. A Statement of the Laws of Peru in Matters Affecting Business. Fourth Edition. General Secretariat, Organization of American States. 1973. Third Edition. 1962. Google Books

Law of Peru